Robert Haven Schauffler (8 April 1879 – 24 November 1964) was an American writer, cellist, athlete, and war hero. Schauffler published poetry, biographies of Beethoven, Brahms, and Schumann and a series of books celebrating American holidays.

Biography
Schauffler was born on 8 April 1879 in Brünn, where his parents were missionaries. By the time he was two he was back in the United States where his family founded the Schauffler College of Religious and Social Work in Cleveland in 1886 for Bohemian immigrants who were interested in social or religious work.

Schauffler's first successful career was as a cellist and he studied with several notable musicians. His academic studies started at the Northwestern University, but he completed his degree at Princeton before going on to study at the University in Berlin in 1902-3. By this time he had already been editor of the Nassau Literary Magazine for a year. On his return from Berlin he combined his skills as a music editor for another magazine. He came to notice in 1912 when he published a book of poetry named after a poem called Scum o' the Earth. This poem had come to notice after being published in a magazine. The poem had focussed attention on the monetary divide between middle class American and poor immigrants.

He represented the United States in men's singles and doubles tennis at the 1906 Intercalated Games in Athens.

In 1907 he published the first of several books that celebrated American holidays. The first were Thanksgiving and Our American Holidays - Christmas. The book he created for Christmas includes several extracts from Dickens, Shakespeare, Leigh Hunt and William Morris. The first section deals with whether there is or is not a Santa Claus by quoting the 1897 editorial by Francis Pharcellus Church. The book is certain that there is.

Schauffler published Arbor Day two years later and there then followed books for Washington's Birthday, Lincoln's Birthday and Independence Day. His final holiday books were not published until after the war and there were Armistice Day in 1927, Plays for Our American Holidays in 1928, Halloween in 1933, and Columbus Day, five years later. His books before World War I involved several on travel. He wrote Through Italy with the Poets in 1908, Romantic Germany the following year and in 1913 he published Romantic America.

Schauffler married before the First World War but his wife, Katharine de Normandie Wilson, died in 1916 and he was a widower for several years. He moved to the Greenbush section of Scituate, Massachusetts, about 1911. He owned property in Scituate from about 1912 to 1919. This was an estate named Arden and included a log cabin studio.

Schauffler joined the Army as a second lieutenant and served as an instructor. He was awarded a Purple Heart for his wounds at the Battle of Montfaucon which took place in mid October 1918. He took up employment as a lecturer when he left the U.S. Army in May 1919 whilst continuing to write poetry in his spare time. He remarried Margaret Widdemer who jointly won the Pulitzer Award for Poetry that year in  1919 for her collection The Old Road to Paradise. Over the next few decades he lectured whilst creating biographies of Schubert, Robert Schumann, Brahms and Beethoven.

In 1942 he again took up the holiday theme when he published the first of three more holiday titles working with Hilah Paulmier. The first was called Democracy Days.... A year later they published Pan American Day and in 1946 and 1947 they published Peace Days and Good will days'''. Schauffler died in 1964 as a divorcee and his papers are stored at the University of Texas at Austin.

Partial list of works

Poetry
Scum o' the Earth and Other Poems, 1912
The White Comrade and Other Poems, 1920
Magic Flame and Other Poems, 1923
The poetry cure, a pocket medicine chest of verse, 1925
 The poetry cure, with Marion Bauer (1927)
 The junior poetry cure (1931)
New and Selected Poems, 1942

Holiday books
 Thanksgiving Our American Holidays - Christmas Arbor Day Washington's Birthday Lincoln's Birthday Independence Day Armistice Day Plays for Our American Holidays Halloween Columbus DayProse
 Franz Schubert: The Ariel of Music (before 1923)
 Peter Pantheism (1925)
 Beethoven: the man who freed music. Vol. 1-2 (1929)
 Hobnails in Eden. Poems of a Maine vagabond (1929)
 A manthology; songs that are fit for men, and a few women (1931)
 The mad musician; an abridgment of Beethoven: the man who freed music (1932)
 The unknown Brahms (1933)
 The magic of music, an anthology for music (1935)
 Florestan, the life and work of Robert Schumann'' (1945)

References

External links

 
 
 
 Robert Schauffler Correspondence

1879 births
1964 deaths
People from the Margraviate of Moravia
Writers from Cleveland
20th-century American poets
American cellists
Brahms scholars
Beethoven scholars
Schumann scholars